Stadio Sterlino was a multi-use stadium in Bologna, Italy. It was initially used as the stadium of Bologna F.C. 1909 matches. It was replaced by Stadio Renato Dall'Ara in 1927.  The capacity of the stadium was 15,000 spectators.

References

Sterlino
Bologna F.C. 1909